Guangzhou University of Chinese Medicine is a university in Guangzhou, the capital of Guangdong Province, China. It is a Chinese state Double First Class University, included in the state Double First Class University Plan.

History 
It was founded in 1924 as Guangdong Traditional Chinese Medicine and Pharmacology School, a tertiary educational institution approved by the government of the Republic of China. In 1956, it became Guangzhou Traditional Chinese Medicine College, with the approval of the State Council of the People's Republic of China, and is one of four earliest established institutions in China specializing in Chinese traditional medicine. It was originally directly affiliated with the Ministry of Health of the People's Republic of China and the State Administration of Traditional Medicine. In 2000, the university became a joint venture between the central government and provincial government, but mainly under the jurisdiction of Guangdong province.

Notable people
Deng Tietao, an alumnus and professor of the university, named "Master of National Medicine" of China

See also
Shenzhen Hospital of Guangzhou University of Chinese Medicine
List of universities in China
List of universities and colleges in Guangdong

References

 
Universities and colleges in Guangzhou
Guangzhou Higher Education Mega Center
Educational institutions established in 1924
1924 establishments in China
Traditional Chinese medicine